Beldibi is a village in the District of Kemer, Antalya Province, Turkey.

Gallery

References

Villages in Kemer District